Richard Frank Gamble (November 16, 1928 – March 22, 2018) was a Canadian professional ice hockey player. He played in the National Hockey League with the Montreal Canadiens, Chicago Black Hawks, and Toronto Maple Leafs between 1950 and 1967. His career, which lasted from 1949 to 1970, was mainly spent in the minor American Hockey League. 

Gamble won the Stanley Cup in 1953 with the Montreal Canadiens. He won the Calder Cup back-to-back with the Rochester Americans in 1965 and 1966. That season, he also won the AHL scoring title and was the league's MVP. Gamble won a third Calder Cup with Rochester in 1967–68. He became the Amerks' player-coach in 1968–69. He retired as a player early in the 1969–70 season. He served as coach until mid-season in 1970–71 when he was replaced by Doug Adam. The Rochester Americans retired Gamble's number 9 jersey along with Jody Gage. Gage broke Gamble's team scoring records while wearing number 9.

Gamble died at the age of 89 in 2018 from congestive heart failure.

Career statistics

Regular season and playoffs

References

External links
 
AHL Hall of Fame Bio

1928 births
2018 deaths
Buffalo Bisons (AHL) players
Canadian ice hockey coaches
Canadian ice hockey left wingers
Chicago Blackhawks players
Ice hockey people from New Brunswick
New Brunswick Sports Hall of Fame inductees
Montreal Canadiens players
Rochester Americans coaches
Rochester Americans players
Sportspeople from Moncton
Stanley Cup champions
Toronto Maple Leafs players